The Marikina Sports Center, also known as Marikina Sports Park and formerly known as Rodriguez Sports Center, is a sports complex located in Marikina, at the corner of Shoe Avenue and Sumulong Highway in Metro Manila, Philippines.

History
Prior to its current sports facilities, the area is a site of PNR Mariquina Station back in the early 1900s. The Rodriguez Sports Center was built in 1969 under the Rizal Governor Isidro Rodriguez Sr. on a  land owned by Marikina, then a municipality of Rizal. It is turned over to the Marikina municipal government under Mayor Bayani Fernando in 1995 and was renovated in 2001 under Mayor Maria Lourdes Carlos-Fernando. and was renamed the Marikina Sports Park.

Following the designation of the facility as the home ground of Philippines Football League sides, JPV Marikina F.C. in 2017, the facility's football pitch underwent renovations to meet league standards.

Facilities

The grandstands have a total seating capacity of 15,000 people. Between the West Stand and the athletics track are basketball and tennis courts. The West Stand is situated along Shoe Avenue. Prior to hosting its first Philippines Football League match, the football pitch hosted a bicycle track.

It also hosts an Olympic-size swimming pool inside an aquatics center which can accommodate 2,000 spectators, a sports building, and an indoor gymnasium with 7,000 seats.

The MSC hosts facilities for football, tennis, basketball, swimming, and martial arts. Its athletics tracks is open to the public in most nights for a small fee which is used for maintenance expenses of the sports center.

Events

The area has been host to several sports competitions, including the 3rd ISF Men's World Championship 1972, the 1st Asian Athletics Championships 1973, and the 2014 ASEAN School Games which serves as the main venue. It also serves as the venue for women's football at the 2005 Southeast Asian Games and supposed to be the main venue of 2020 Palarong Pambansa but canceled due to coronavirus pandemic. The venue also hosted several entertainment shows such as grand concerts, finals night, and live television shows.

Aside from hosting events, Marikina Sports Center also host sports clinics for the residents of Marikina during the summer season yearly, dubbed the "Summer Sports Camp".

The main stadium of the facility has hosted Philippines Football League matches as the designated home venue of JPV Marikina F.C. since 2018. The facility has been named the home venue of the JPV Marikina since the inaugural 2017 PFL season though the club didn't play a single home game in the venue due to renovation works. The club started playing their home games at the venue on March 3, 2018, with a 2-1 win over Global Cebu.

External links

References

1969 establishments in the Philippines
Athletics (track and field) venues in the Philippines
Basketball venues in the Philippines
Buildings and structures in Marikina
Football venues in the Philippines
Sports venues completed in 1969
Sports venues in Metro Manila
Swimming venues in the Philippines
Tennis venues in the Philippines